"Alive Again" is a song performed by American singer-actress Cher from her twenty-fourth studio album, Living Proof. It was released as a third and final European single from the album on June 11, 2002 by WEA, while the song remains unreleased in North America. The song has never been performed live. The song had received positive reviews from music critics, but its commercial response was limited and quite poor in some European countries. It managed to chart in Germany and Switzerland.

Background
"Alive Again" was written by Nick Bracegirdle, Ray Hedges and Tracy Ackerman, while it was produced by Bracegirdle and Hedges. The song was featured on Cher's album Living Proof. 
In 2002, "Alive Again" was used as the official German Olympic winter plays song in Salt Lake City. American fashion retailer Abercrombie & Fitch, used "Alive Again" in their Spring 2009 playlist. "Alive Again" featured on the international release of The Very Best of Cher. Sal Cinquemani called this song "trance anthem."

Release history
"Alive Again" was released exclusively throughout Europe, but the song failed to pick up the attention that "The Music's No Good Without You" received. The single in part suffered from a lack of promotion. In early 2002 Cher had complications with her record company which affected the further promotion for the single, because of this the future plans to release "Song for the Lonely" and "A Different Kind of Love Song" as European singles were dropped. Although "The Music's No Good Without You" was previously released as a club single in the United States, "Alive Again" remains unreleased in North America.

Chart performance
The song entered the German singles chart where it became a top-forty hit. The song also entered both the Swiss and Romanian charts, but was unsuccessful charting at eighty and fifty-eight.

Music video

In 2002, the video for "Alive Again" was shot and was later released in Europe only. The video features Cher in a blue room singing the song while appearing in many different colored wigs.

The footage used for the video was originally intended to be used in an advertisement to promote Living Proof. Some additional scenes from the video shoot are featured on the Dan-O-Rama Screen Projection for Cher's Living Proof: The Farewell Tour intro video and also during the 'Quote Attack' segment on the Tour DVD. When It was decided that "Alive Again" would be released in Germany a video was made using this footage. This is why Cher does not lip-sync the first verse and only sings while wearing the red wig.

Unreleased footage has Cher lip-syncing to others songs on the album - During one shot in the video Cher is seen singing in a blonde, shaggy wig. This is actually to another album track.

Charts

Release history

References

External links
 Official website of Cher

2002 singles
Cher songs
Songs written by Ray Hedges
Songs written by Tracy Ackerman
Songs written by Chicane (musician)
Song recordings produced by Ray Hedges
House music songs
2001 songs